Masanori Ito may refer to:

Masanori Ito (footballer) (born 1978), Japanese footballer and futsal manager
Masanori Ito (journalist) (1889–1962), Japanese journalist, author and military commentator
Masanori Ito (music critic) (born 1953), Japanese music critic and radio personality, known as Seisoku Ito